Yannick Hanfmann was the defending champion but chose not to defend his title.

Mario Vilella Martínez won the title after defeating Federico Gaio 7–6(7–3), 1–6, 6–3 in the final.

Seeds

Draw

Finals

Top half

Bottom half

References

External links
Main draw
Qualifying draw

Internazionali di Tennis Città di Todi - 1
2021 Singles